Kantanos-Selino is a municipality in Chania regional unit, Crete, Greece. It is numbered 4 on the map of the Chania region. The seat of the municipality is the village of Palaiochora. A significant number of fresco's painted by Ioannis Pagomenos are located in Selino.

Municipality
The municipality Kantanos-Selino was formed at the 2011 local government reform by the merger of the following 3 former municipalities, that became municipal units:
East Selino
Kantanos
Pelekanos

It forms the southwest part of the Chania region and of Crete, and is bordered by Kissamos (5) to the northwest, by Platanias (6) to the north, and by Sfakia (7) to the east.

References

Chania (regional unit)
Municipalities of Crete
Populated places in Chania (regional unit)